Alchin is a surname. Notable people with the surname include:

Gordon Alchin (1894–1947), British politician
Jason Alchin (born 1967), Australian rugby league footballer
William Turner Alchin (1790–1865), English antiquarian and solicitor

See also
Allchin